"Hello Sunshine" is a song by Bruce Springsteen, released in 2019 as the lead single from the album Western Stars, on April 26. It is a melancholic, mellow ballad that reflects the influences of Jimmy Webb, Glen Campbell and Burt Bacharach. Lyrically, the track finds Springsteen, who has "fallen in love with lonely", driving endlessly on an empty road.

Release and reviews
The song was well received. Pitchfork described it as "gorgeous", and compared it to country music classics “Everybody’s Talkin’”, “Gentle on My Mind” and “Good Time Charlie’s Got the Blues”. Spin describes it as having a "gorgeous wordless bridge" and as a "simple love song, aimed at universal truths, not short-story specifics", with "reactive and lyrical strings".

Charts

References

2019 singles
2019 songs
Bruce Springsteen songs
Songs written by Bruce Springsteen
Song recordings produced by Ron Aniello